Jalysus is a genus of stilt bugs in the family Berytidae. There are about 12 described species in Jalysus.

Species
These 12 species belong to the genus Jalysus:

 Jalysus albidus Stusak, 1968
 Jalysus caducus (Distant, 1884)
 Jalysus clavatus Henry, 1997
 Jalysus macer (Stal, 1859)
 Jalysus mexicanus Henry, 1997
 Jalysus nigriventris Henry, 1997
 Jalysus ossesae Henry, 2007
 Jalysus reductus Barber, 1939
 Jalysus sobrinus Stal, 1862
 Jalysus spinosus (Say, 1824)
 Jalysus tuberculatus Henry, 1997
 Jalysus wickhami Van Duzee, 1906 (spined stilt bug)

References

Further reading

External links

 

Berytidae
Articles created by Qbugbot